For the political leader in Florida see John Pease Sanderson

John Phillip Sanderson (February 13, 1818 – October 14, 1864) was a soldier, influential politician, lawyer, author, newspaper editor, and member of the Pennsylvania General Assembly. He is probably most well known for his exposé of the secret political organization known as the Knights of the Golden Circle, which led to its demise.

Lawyer
Sanderson was admitted to the bar in 1839. He practiced law in Philadelphia from about 1848-1861.

Author and editor
Sanderson was the author of Views and Opinions of American Statesmen on Foreign Immigration (Philadelphia, 1843), and Republican Landmarks (1850). He edited & published the weekly Demokratischer Whig starting in 1843, and the Anti-Masonic weekly, Der Libanon Demokrat from 1844 to 1848.  He was then the editor of the Philadelphia Daily News from 1848 to 1856.

Politician
Sanderson was elected to the Pennsylvania State House of Representatives in 1845 and to the Pennsylvania State Senate in 1847. He was the state chairman of the Know-Nothing Party, when it renamed itself the American Party in 1855.

United States presidential election of 1856
Hopes that the Pennsylvania fusion ticket would prevent Buchanan's victory, were dashed when John P. Sanderson, the Know-Nothing Party's state chairman, announced that the original slate of the American Party electors would remain in the field, thereby diluting the strength of the "Union" fusionist ticket. Former president Millard Fillmore's "Know-Nothing" candidacy helping James Buchanan to defeat John C. Frémont, the first Republican candidate in the 1856 United States presidential election.

United States presidential election of 1860
Sanderson was one of the Pennsylvania delegates to the 1860 Republican National Convention at Chicago. He was one of Simon Cameron's confidential advisers. Sanderson, in conference with Judge David Davis, who most prominently represented the Lincoln interest, came to a practical agreement on the night before the balloting that Pennsylvania's vote after a complimentary ballot for Cameron be cast for Lincoln, and that Lincoln should give Cameron a cabinet position. The casting of Pennsylvania's vote for Abraham Lincoln on the second ballot was one of the facts that contributed most toward Lincoln's nomination for the 1860 United States presidential election.

Soldier
When Cameron was named Secretary of War in President Abraham Lincoln's cabinet, Sanderson was appointed chief clerk of the War Department on March 4, 1861. He resigned from that position to become lieutenant colonel of his son George K. Sanderson's regiment the 15th U.S. Infantry on May 14, 1861. He reported to Newport Barracks and assumed command of the regiment's headquarters.

Sanderson was appointed colonel of the 13th U.S. Infantry on July 4, 1863, and soon after accepted a position as an aide to Major General William Rosecrans on the staff of the Army of the Cumberland, where he served during the Battle of Chickamauga. After Rosecrans was relieved of his command Sanderson went with him.

When Rosecrans took command of the Department of the Missouri late in January 1864, he brought Sanderson with him as Provost Marshal General of the Department of the Missouri. An assistant to Secretary of War Edwin M. Stanton, Charles A. Dana, accused Colonel Sanderson of cowardice at the Battle of Chickamauga. This initially held up Congressional approval of his appointment, but Rosecrans soundly refuted this.

Headquarters Department Of The Missouri,

Saint Louis, April 28, 1864. Hon. James L. Thomas,

Mayor of Saint Louis:

Dear Sir : It was my intention yesterday to speak to you about my provost-marshal-general, Colonel Sanderson, whose name is before the Senate for confirmation, in regular line of promotion, as colonel of the Thirteenth U. S. Infantry. I understand that charges have been made against him before the Senate Military Committee for misconduct at the battle of Chickamauga, while serving on my personal staff. I believe the charges to be maliciously false and without the shadow of foundation, but as it now stands it injures his usefulness in the position which he now fills.

Colonel Sanderson is prepared to refute any charges made against him, and his papers are in the hands of Senator Cowan, of Pennsylvania; but the difficulty is to get the case before the Senate from the Military Committee and have action taken upon it, and my object in writing you is to ask you to unite with such of your friends as may be willing to do so with you in asking the U. S. Senators from this State to try and bring the case before the Senate for their action, on the ground that the interests of this State demand, in view of the important position that he holds, that the matter should be settled at once. If he is innocent he should be vindicated, and I believe he has the evidence to fully vindicate himself, and if guilty he should be relieved from the important position that he fills.

If you have no objection you will much oblige me, and I believe serve the interests of the State, by writing to Senators Brown and Henderson, and getting any of your political friends to join you in the request, asking them to call upon the Military Committee to bring the case before the Senate for their action. I do not ask them to take sides in the matter at all, but merely to afford Colonel Sanderson, through his friend Senator Cowan, who has his papers, the opportunity of vindicating himself from the charges made against him before the Military Committee.

Very respectfully, your obedient servant,

W. S. ROSECRANS,

Major- General

Colonel Sanderson served in this position until his death after a month's illness at St. Louis, Missouri on October 14, 1864.

Sanderon's most important public service was the full exposition that he made during the civil war of the secret political organization in the northern and western states, known as the "Knights of the Golden Circle" or the "Order of American knights." His exposure of this organization led to the breaking up of that order.

References

External links
 
J. P. Sanderson papers, 1846-1865.

Pennsylvania lawyers
Republican Party members of the Pennsylvania House of Representatives
Republican Party Pennsylvania state senators
19th-century American newspaper editors
19th-century American newspaper publishers (people)
People of Pennsylvania in the American Civil War
Union Army colonels
1818 births
1864 deaths
Pennsylvania Know Nothings
American male journalists
19th-century American male writers
19th-century American lawyers